Seamus Metress (born 1933) is a professor of anthropology at the University of Toledo, Ohio.  He has been teaching at the university level for over 30 years.   He received his Ph.D. from Indiana University in 1971. Also, he attended The University of Notre Dame, when it was an all-boys college.

Areas of Interest: Race and Ethnicity, Medical Anthropology, Conflict in Northern Ireland
Research: Biocultural Anthropology, Irish Studies and Ethnic Conflict 
Field Research projects in Northeast Ireland and the Great Lakes Region.

Quotes
On the topic of the Great Famine of Ireland:

"These same apologists feel that there was nothing that any government could have done to ameliorate the situation. The poor British tried, but were simply overwhelmed by the logistics of the operation. In their view the starvation was the inevitable outcome of demography and the prevalent economic theory of the day."  (From The Great Starvation and British Imperialism in Ireland.)

Bibliography
Metress has published over 30 books and numerous articles.  A partial list includes:

Man in Ecological Perspective (Editor, 1972)
Man in Evolutionary Perspective (Editor, with C. Loring Brace, 1973)
Aging and Health: Biologic and Social Perspectives (with Cary S. Kart and Eileen K. Metress, 1978)
Listen Irish People (published by Todd & Honeywell, Inc., 1979) 
The Irish-American Experience: A Guide to the Literature (1981)
Euro-American Elderly: An Ethnic Bibliography (with Eileen K Metress, 1983)
The hunger strike and the final struggle (1983)
Nutrition, the Aged, and Society (with Cary S. Kart, 1984)
A Regional Guide to Informational Sources on the Irish in the United States and Canada (Public Administration Series : Bibliography, P 1841)  (1986)
Aging, Health, and Society (with Cary Steven Kart and Eileen Metress, 1988)
Human Aging and Chronic Disease (with Cary S. Kart and Eileen K. Metress, 1992)
The American Irish and Irish Nationalism: A Sociohistorical Introduction (1995)
The great starvation: An Irish holocaust (1996)
Irish In North America A Regional Biography (with Donna Hardy-Johnston, 1999)
Irish in Toledo: History and Memory (Editor, with Molly Schiever, 2005)
Irish in Michigan (Discovering the Peoples of Michigan Series) (with Eileen K. Metress, 2006)

References

Further reading

Co-Author, Aging, Health and Society

1933 births
University of Notre Dame alumni
Indiana University alumni
University of Toledo faculty
Living people